Marian Wendt (born 9 June 1985) is a German politician of the Christian Democratic Union (CDU) who served as a member of the Bundestag from the state of Saxony from 2013 until 2021.

Political career 
Wendt became a member of the Bundestag in the 2013 German federal election, representing North Saxony. He was a member of the Committee on Petitions and the Committee on Internal Affairs. From 2018, he was also a member of the Committee for the Scrutiny of Acoustic Surveillance of the Private Home. He served as his parliamentary group’s rapporteur on political extremism and the EU–US Privacy Shield.

In addition to his committee assignments, Wendt was part of the German-Italian Parliamentary Friendship Group, the German Parliamentary Friendship Group for Relations with the States of South-Eastern Europe and the Berlin-Taipei Parliamentary Circle of Friends.

In September 2020, Wendt announced that he would not stand in the 2021 federal elections but instead resign from active politics by the end of the parliamentary term.

Political positions 
Ahead of the Christian Democrats’ leadership election in 2018, Wendt publicly endorsed Friedrich Merz to succeed Angela Merkel as the party’s chair. For the 2021 national elections, he later endorsed Markus Söder as the Christian Democrats' joint candidate to succeed Merkel as Germany's chancellor.

References

External links 

  
 Bundestag biography 

1985 births
Living people
Members of the Bundestag for Saxony
Members of the Bundestag 2017–2021
Members of the Bundestag 2013–2017
Members of the Bundestag for the Christian Democratic Union of Germany